Thomas Jung may refer to:

 Thomas Jung (politician) (born 1961), German politician (SPD)
 Thomas Jung (rower) (born 1969), German rower
 Thomas Jung (conductor) (born 1984), German conductor